Tyler Gibson (born January 12, 1991) is an American-born in thai professional soccer player who plays as a midfielder for USL Championship club Louisville City. he represents Thailand International Levely.

Career

College career
A four-year starter at Charlotte, Gibson was named Atlantic 10 midfielder and Freshmen-of-the-Year for the 2009 season. He was a four-time All Atlantic 10 conference First Team selection. He was twice named to the Hermann Award watch list and helped the 49ers earn a CUSA Conference Championship his senior year.

Professional career
Originally invited to the 2014 Major League Soccer Combine, Gibson was projected as a second round pick due to his vision and work ethic. He was signed as a rookie to the Scorpions leading into the 2015 NASL season. He quickly received playing time during the 2015 NASL Spring Season and ended the year starting 22 matches.

The Scorpions suspended operations following the 2015 NASL season and Gibson signed with expansion side Rayo OKC on January 26, 2016.

On November 21, 2017, Gibson joined FC Cincinnati of the United Soccer League.

After two seasons in the USL Championship with Indy Eleven, Gibson made the move to Louisville City on December 14, 2020, ahead of the upcoming 2021 season.

References

1991 births
Living people
American soccer players
Association football midfielders
Charlotte 49ers men's soccer players
FC Cincinnati (2016–18) players
Indy Eleven players
Louisville City FC players
North American Soccer League players
Rayo OKC players
San Antonio Scorpions players
San Francisco Deltas players
Soccer players from Tennessee
Sportspeople from Knoxville, Tennessee
USL Championship players